Rácz István (born 1952) is a Hungarian dendrologist, curator, and museologist.

Research fields 
Woody plant (primarily conifer) taxonomy, ecology, conservation, and herbarium development.

Biography 
Received his diploma from the University of Horticulture, Budapest in 1976. From that year Istvan Racz has worked at the Botanical Department of the Hungarian Natural History Museum  as a member of the Dendrological Documentation project. Received doctorate and then Ph.D from the University of Silviculture in Sopron, Hungary in 1984 and 1997, respectively. As part of the dendrological documentation team led by Zsolt Debreczy research botanist, he had worked in many leading institutes worldwide, including the Arnold Arboretum of Harvard University, also in other major herbaria, arboreta and botanical gardens in the U.S., England, Scotland, Ireland, Germany, and Poland. Istvan Racz also participated in large-scale botanical expeditions led to various parts of the temperate and adjacent zones, including northern North America, Mexico, China, Chile, Japan, Taiwan, New Zealand and Tasmania. Co-author or author of numerous books and scientific articles.

Selected publications

Scientific journal articles 
 
 Rácz, I., – Huyen, D. D. (2007): Study of a low-elevation occurrence of Pinus dalatensis Ferré (Pinaceae) in Gia Lai Province, Vietnam. Studia bot. hung. 38: 133–142.

Books 
 Vajda, L. – Rácz, I. Flora Photographica Hungarica. (text with: Zs. Debreczy & F. Németh) Képzőművészeti Kiadó, Budapest. 180 p. 1984 (in Hungarian). 
 Debreczy, Zs. & Rácz, I.: Fenyők a Föld Körül (Conifers Around the Earth). in Hungarian with English summary. Dendrological Foundation, Budapest, 2000. pp. 552. 
 Debreczy, Zs. – Rácz, I. (2011): Conifers Around the World. DendroPress Ltd., Budapest. pp. 1089.

Awards 
 Award of Excellence, Ministry of Education and Culture, Hungary. 1979
 Honorary Professor, Budapest Corvinus University (2013)

Fellowships 
 Mercer Fellowship, Arnold Arboretum of Harvard University, United States (1988–1990)
 Synthesys Project (EU), Royal Botanic Garden, Edinburgh, Scotland (2011)
 Visiting Scientist, Kyoto University, Japan (2013)

References

External links 
 Hungarian Natural History Museum - Department of Botany, Herbarium Generale - István Rácz profile
 Conifers Around the World (Curriculum vitae - István Rácz)
 International Dendrological Research Institute (Scientists' Biographies)

Botanists with author abbreviations
20th-century Hungarian botanists
Scientists from Budapest
1952 births
Living people
Corvinus University of Budapest alumni
21st-century Hungarian botanists